The Pentacle, or Pentacle, is a DC Comics supervillain group, a team that served as counterparts to the superhero group, the Shadowpact. Created by Bill Willingham, the Pentacle first appeared in Shadowpact #1 (July 2006).

Shadowpact
When the Pentacle's leader, Strega, created a hemogoblin bubble barrier that was impenetrable, the Shadowpact was called by the Phantom Stranger, who opened a doorway to the bubble for them to enter and for them to find out what was going on. The Pentacle was taking over a small part of a town and was using the residents as human sacrifices to complete a spell used by Strega. As soon as the Shadowpact entered the bubble, Nightshade ran into a member of the Pentacle, Sister Shadow, and the two quickly fought.

Meanwhile, the rest of the Pentacle became aware of the Shadowpact's presence and the two groups began to fight each other. During each fight, it was shown that the Pentacle mirrored the Shadowpact. While all members of the Pentacle took down their counterparts, each one was to not kill them and to bring their unconscious Shadowpact member to Strega so they could imprison them. However, only one member of the Pentacle, Karnevil, didn't follow orders. Instead of bringing his counterpart, Detective Chimp, to Strega, Karnevil tied him to a post and prepared to torture him.

When Karnevil returned to Strega without Detective Chimp, Strega demanded that he retrieved Chimp so they could put him with the rest of his teammates. When Karnevil returned to the post, Detective Chimp had escaped and then he easily subdued Karnevil. Then, another member of the Pentacle, the White Rabbit, felt disgusted by Strega's ways of killing, so he freed the Shadowpact. Enchantress took him out, however, knowing that he still couldn't be trusted. While Enchantress and Nightmaster thought of a spell to destroy the barrier, the rest of the team (excluding Detective Chimp) took down the remaining members of the Pentacle. When Detective Chimp finally caught up with the three, Enchantress' spell took effect, which had burst the barrier. After the Shadowpact discovered Strega had gotten away, they realized that the whole time they were in the barrier, a year had passed by in the world outside of it, causing each of them to age one year, all due to Enchantress' spell.

Blue Devil then sent Jack of Fire to Hell with his trident, while Nightshade trapped the remaining four in darkness cubes of hers and then the Shadowpact sent them to the Black Tower, a prison in another dimension.

Current whereabouts
The Pentacle is currently no longer together and has not been since they've been imprisoned. Jack of Fire, the White Rabbit, Sister Shadow and Bagman have not been seen since they were sent to the Black Tower, never appearing in another issue of Shadowpact or any other comic book series again. Strega quickly returned in the Shadowpact series. She freed a warlock named Doctor Gotham and together they tried to summon a Sun King. Strega believed many humans would have to be sacrificed for the summoning to work, however, she was deceived by Dr. Gotham, who knew only one person had to be sacrificed, so he gave Strega cancer that quickly advanced, killing her within minutes. She was never seen in another issue of Shadowpact and has not ever been seen in any other series since.

The only member of the Pentacle who has made numerous appearances in other titles and is currently being used as a comic book villain is Karnevil. He appeared in one more issue of Shadowpact, where he managed to escape the Black Tower by beating his guard and escaping back to Earth through a portal in which goods from Earth were coming through. Karnevil has appeared in many other titles written by Bill Willingham.

Membership
Strega — the leader of The Pentacle and a counterpart of the Shadowpact member Enchantress. Strega is a sorceress and most of her spells are powered by blood, which is why she is always needing human sacrifices. She is skilled at necromancy and has longevity.
Jack of Fire (Jack Cassidy) — the counterpart of the Shadowpact member Blue Devil. Jack has demonic strength and durability and can create blasts of fire. He claims he is Blue Devil's older brother, and that they have a sister named Mary. Jack also says that his parents were pulled out of heaven and put into Hell because of the deal Blue Devil made with Neron (their parents and a demon confirm it). Jack shows a strong hatred for Blue Devil.
The White Rabbit — the counterpart of the Shadowpact member Nightmaster. An albino, he possesses a sword that is enchanted, which he is highly skilled with. It can cause unconsciousness with even a light scratch. He despises mass murder.
Bagman — the counterpart of the Shadowpact member Ragman. Bagman can transform into goo, then absorb and digest matter.
Sister Shadow — the counterpart of the Shadowpact member Nightshade. She can transform into varied shadow creatures.
Karnevil (Jeremy Karne) — the counterpart of the Shadowpact member Detective Chimp. Karnevil has no powers, but he is a sociopathic teenager who is obsessed with murder. He claims he died and went to Hell but the demons returned him to life because he was too much trouble for them.

References

External links
The Pentacle at DC Wikia
The Pentacle at Comic Vine

DC Comics supervillain teams